Amin Tarokh (11 August 1953 – 24 September 2022) was an Iranian actor. He has received various accolades, including a Crystal Simorgh, a Hafez Award. He also used to teach acting and was the teacher of famous actors like Taraneh Alidoosti, Gelareh Abbasi, Shabnam Moghaddami, Navid Pourfaraj, Pouria Rahimisam, Majid Vasheghani, Hedieh Bazvand and more.

Early life
Tarokh was born in Shiraz. After finishing high school in Shiraz, he started his education at Tehran University. He graduated from University of Tehran with a degree in cultural management. Tarokh had three sons named Nima, Mani and Nami. He also had a casting production company in Tehran.

Career
Tarokh started acting in 1973. He opened the first acting school in 1994, "The Open Workshop of Acting". His graduates have won many awards. In 2000, he connected his school to other international acting schools, and he was invited to Australia to teach in the Flinders Drama centre. There he taught for two years.
He was a member of the judging council in numerous festivals, and also a member of the House of Cinema. He was invited to many festivals in other countries such as Germany. As of 1995, he was considered one of the influential figures in reviving Theatrical art in Iran.

Death
Tarokh died from a heart attack in Tehran, on 24 September 2022, at the age of 69.

Filmography

Film

Web

Television

Awards and nominations

References

External links

1953 births
2022 deaths
Iranian male stage actors
Iranian male film actors
People from Shiraz
Iranian male television actors
20th-century Iranian male actors
21st-century Iranian male actors
Crystal Simorgh for Best Supporting Actor winners
University of Tehran alumni